SoftAP is an abbreviated term for "software enabled access point". This is software enabling a computer which hasn't been specifically made to be a router into a wireless access point.  It is often used interchangeably with the term "virtual router".

History on Windows
The first SoftAP software was shipped by Ralink with their Wi-Fi cards for Windows XP.  It enabled a Wi-Fi card to act as a wireless access point.  While a card was acting as a wireless access point, it could not continue to stay connected as a client, so any Internet access had to come from another device, such as an Ethernet device. Following Ralink's card innovation, a number of other Wi-Fi vendors, including Edimax, later released SoftAP software for their devices.  Neither Ralink nor Edimax updated their software to work with Windows Vista, due to the installation of its new driver model, bringing an effective end to this software category until the release of Windows 7 in 2009.

Microsoft added a feature called "Virtual Wi-Fi" to Windows 7 and later operating systems, which enabled a Wi-Fi card to act as both a Wi-Fi client and a wireless access point simultaneously. Although a relatively fresh concept, new computers with Windows 7 and above were now being released with "Virtual WiFi" as a default program, making personal computing less complicated without the need for a second device. With this "technological advancement", the "virtual" Wi-Fi feature allows desktop computers to create a wireless hotspot / portable hotspot / Wi-Fi hotspot that other wireless devices in the vicinity can use. The feature was ultimately considered "unfinished", as it never received a user interface. Unfortunately, "Virtual WiFi" was not enthusiastically promoted amongst the industry, either on its own merit, or with the help of marketing materials at launch.

Purpose
SoftAP is a common method of configuring Wi-Fi products without a display or input device, such as a Wi-Fi enabled appliance, home security camera, smart home product or any other IoT device. 
The process typically involves these steps:

 The headless device turns on a SoftAP Wi-Fi hotspot. 
 The user downloads a product-specific app on a smartphone, and the app then either uses the underlying Android or iOS operating system to connect to the SoftAP hotspot, or directs the user to connect the phone manually. 
 The app then asks the user for the user's private Wi-Fi network name (SSID) and passkey
 The app sends the SSID and passkey to the headless device over the SoftAP connection.
 The headless device then falls off the SoftAP network and joins the user's private Wi-Fi network.

This process can work well, but there are two core problems.  First, the process often requires the user to manually connect to the SoftAP network, which can be confusing for mainstream users.  Second, if the user enters the passkey incorrectly, or if the phone gets disconnected from the SoftAP network for any reason, it is difficult for the app and device to smoothly recover, so the user is often left having to factory reset the device and start over.  Third, different phones (hardware and OS versions) handle SoftAP differently, so the user experience varies dramatically—especially with the wide variety of Android hardware and software.

Because of these complexities, many companies making Wi-Fi connected products are now adding BLE, ZipKey, data-over-sound, or another technology to facilitate a better out-of-box experience for users.

Platform support
Various operating system platforms support SoftAP, including:

 Linux
 Windows 7
 Windows 8
 Windows 10
 Android
 Windows Phone 7.5
 Windows Phone 8
 Windows 10 Mobile
 iOS
 Mac OS

Commercial vendors
 Connectify
 Edimax
 Ralink

See also
 Wi-Fi Direct
 Connectify

References

Network access